This list of mechanical engineering awards is an index to articles about notable awards for mechanical engineering.

Awards

See also

 Lists of awards
 Lists of science and technology awards
 List of engineering awards

References

 
Mechanical engineering